CCGS Cape Sutil is a Canadian Coast Guard  stationed at Port Hardy, British Columbia. She was commissioned by Herb Dhaliwal, the Minister of Fisheries and Oceans, on 1 August 2000 at CCG Station Port Hardy at the northern tip of Vancouver Island.

Design
It contains two, computer-operated Caterpillar 3196 diesel engines. Providing a combined . It has two  four-blade propellers, and its complement is four crew members and five passengers.

Communication options include Raytheon 152 HF-SSB and Motorola Spectra 9000 VHF50W radios, and a Raytheon RAY 430 loudhailer system. The boat also supports the Simrad TD-L1550 VHF-FM radio direction finder. Raytheon provides a number of other electronic systems for the lifeboat, including the RAYCHART 620, the ST 30 heading indicator and ST 50 depth indicator, the NAV 398 global positioning system, a RAYPILOT 650 autopilot system, and either the R41X AN or SPS-69 radar systems.

See also
 47-foot Motor Lifeboat

References

External links

Official site

Cape-class motor lifeboats
1998 ships
Ships built in Ontario
Ships of the Canadian Coast Guard